Boavista Futebol Clube, commonly known as Boavista, is a Portuguese sports club from the city of Porto.

Current squad

Titles

Official
 Campeonato Nacional de Futebol Feminino: 11
1985–86, 1986–87, 1987–88, 1988–89, 1989–90, 1990–91, 1991–92, 1992–93, 1993–94, 1994–95, 1996–97 
 Taça de Portugal de Futebol Feminino: 1
2012–13

References

External links
 Boavista's website
 Boavista on zerazero.pt

Women's football clubs in Portugal
Boavista F.C.
Football clubs in Porto
Campeonato Nacional de Futebol Feminino teams